"The Stolen Farthings" is Tale 154 from Grimm's Fairy Tales. It is actually a ghost story.  It is Aarne-Thompson type 769, A Child Returns from the Dead.

Synopsis
A couple was having dinner with a guest. At midnight, the guest saw a girl in white dress  came in the house and go straight into the next room. The same thing happened again the next day and the day after that. The guest told the father what happened. The father said he had never seen the girl before. One night, the guest peeked in the room. He saw the little girl sitting on the floor, and digging up something between the boards of the floor. He reported what he saw to the mother, and she told him that it was probably their child who had died a month ago. The child received 2 farthings from the mother and was planning on giving it to a poor man. She changed her mind and decided to hide them between the floorboards so she could buy biscuits later. However, she did not get to use them before she died. Thus, it came back to check on the farthings. They donated the farthings to a poor man and the ghost never came back.

References

Grimms' Fairy Tales
ATU 750-849